Christabelle Howie (also spelled Christobel Howie, born. 18 May 1969 in Chennai, India) was crowned Femina Miss India Universe 1991 and represented India at Miss Universe 1991.

Miss Universe 1991 
Howie won the title of Miss India in 1991. A few months later, on 17 May 1991 in Las Vegas, Nevada, U.S., she and 72 contestants competed for the title of Miss Universe 1991.

Preliminary competition scores at Miss Universe 1991
Swimsuit Round : 7.60
Interview Round : 8.60
Evening Gown Round : 8.11
Average : 8.103

References

1969 births
Female models from Chennai
Femina Miss India winners
Living people
Miss Universe 1991 contestants